Montroc is a hamlet in eastern France, located in the territory of the commune of Chamonix.

Several houses at Poses 150m North East of Montroc were destroyed on the 9th of February 1999 by a slab avalanche from Bec du Lachat and Mont Peclerey on the Mont Blanc massif, killing 12 people. In July, 2003, the Mayor of Chamonix, Michel Charlet, received a three-month suspended prison sentence for his part in the handling of events immediately prior to the avalanche. There is a memorial to those lost at site of the avalanche on the road from Montroc to Le Tour.

External links
 Montroc avalanche at PisteHors.com

Villages in Auvergne-Rhône-Alpes